Mary Elizabeth Williams is an American writer and commentator. She is a staff writer for the online magazine Salon. She has also written for The New York Times, The Nation, and other publications. As a commentator, she has made appearances on MSNBC, Today, and NBC Nightly News.

In 2009, Williams released a memoir titled Gimme Shelter.

Personal life
Mary Elizabeth Williams grew up in Jersey City, New Jersey. She has described herself as a practicing Catholic.

In August 2010, Williams was diagnosed with malignant melanoma and underwent surgery. In August 2011, she was rediagnosed with stage IV melanoma. Later that year, she entered a stage I clinical trial for an experimental immunotherapy cancer drug, with which she had significant success and has remained in remission as of 2019. Williams has documented her experiences with cancer on Salon and in her book A Series of Catastrophes and Miracles: A True Story of Love, Science, and Cancer, published in 2016.

References

External links
 Personal website
 Salon.com columns

Living people
Writers from Jersey City, New Jersey
Temple University alumni
Salon (website) people
Year of birth missing (living people)
Catholics from New Jersey